Grandma pizza is a distinct thin, rectangular style of pizza attributed to Long Island, New York. Typically topped with cheese and tomato sauce, it is reminiscent of pizzas baked at home by Italian housewives who lacked a pizza oven. The pizza is often compared to Sicilian pizza.

A grandma pizza is typically rectangular, with the cheese placed before the tomato sauce, baked in a sheet pan in a home oven, and cut into small squares.

History
The origins of grandma pizza can be traced back to the early 20th century when immigrants from southern Italy developed a pizza that would be made at home with simple ingredients with standard American cooking equipment (including a standard kitchen oven and sheet pan). The pie's humble roots left it dubbed "grandma pizza",
since it was mainly made by first-generation immigrants in their own kitchens. 

Despite having existed for generations, the term "grandma pizza" was little known outside of Long Island. Around 1994, Umberto Corteo introduced "Sicilian Grandma pizza" at his Long Island pizzerias; unlike typical thick-crusted Sicilian pizza, his Grandma Sicilian pizza had a thinner crust, though not as thin as Neapolitan. Within a few years, "Grandma pizza" began being advertised by other Long Island restaurants.  

By the late 2000s and early 2010s, the name caught on and numerous pizzerias began to offer the pie.  Rather than being derogatory, the name indicates both respect for tradition and the simple rustic pizza eaten at home growing up.

References

Pizza in the United States
Pizza styles
Pizza in New York City